Field Marshal John Ligonier, 1st Earl Ligonier,  (7 November 168028 April 1770), was a French Huguenot exile, born Jean Louis de Ligonier in Castres, Southern France. He had a long and distinguished career in the British army and was appointed Commander-in-chief in 1757.

During the Seven Years' War, he also served as Master-General of the Ordnance, effectively acting as Minister of War for the Pitt–Newcastle ministry. He retired from active duty in 1763 and died at his home in London on 28 April 1770.

Military career
The son of Louis de Ligonier, a member of a Huguenot family of Castres in the south of France that had emigrated to England in 1697, and Louise Ligonier (née du Poncet), John Ligonier was educated in France and Switzerland. He joined a regiment in Flanders commanded by Lord Cutts in 1702.

He fought, with distinction, in the War of the Spanish Succession and was one of the first to mount the breach at the siege of Liège in October 1702. After becoming a captain in the 10th Foot on 10 February 1703, he commanded a company at the battles of Schellenberg in July 1704 and Blenheim in August 1704, and was present at Menen where he led the storming of the covered way as well as Ramillies in May 1706, Oudenarde in July 1708 and Malplaquet in September 1709 where he received twenty-three bullets through his clothing yet remained unhurt. In 1712, he became governor of Fort St. Philip, Menorca. During the War of the Quadruple Alliance in 1719 he was adjutant-general of the troops employed in the Vigo expedition, where he led the stormers of Pontevedra.

Two years later he became colonel of the Black Horse. He was made a brigadier general in 1735, major general in 1739, and accompanied Lord Stair in the Rhine Campaign of 1742 to 1743. He was promoted to lieutenant general on 26 February 1742 and George II made him a Knight of the Bath on the field of Dettingen in June 1743. At Fontenoy in May 1745, Ligonier commanded the British, Hanoverian, and Hessian infantry.

During the Jacobite rising of 1745 he was called home to command the British army in the Midlands. In November 1745 he led a column of troops sent to Lancashire to oppose the rebels. Having been promoted to the rank of general of horse on 3 January 1746, he was placed at the head of the British and British-paid contingents of the Allied army in the Low Countries in June 1746.

He was present at Rocoux in October 1746 and, having been made Lieutenant-General of the Ordnance on 19 March 1747, he fought at Lauffeld in July 1747, where he led the charge of the British cavalry. He did this with such vigour that he overthrew the whole line of French cavalry. In this encounter his horse was killed and he was taken prisoner by Louis XV, but was exchanged within a few days. The official despatch reported:

He became Member of Parliament for Bath in March 1748 and colonel of the 2nd Dragoon Guards in 1749. From 1748 to 1770 he was governor of the French Hospital.

On 6 April 1750 he was appointed Governor of Guernsey and on 3 February 1753 he became colonel of the Royal Horse Guards.

Seven Years' War

In September 1757, following the disgrace of the Duke of Cumberland who had signed the Convention of Klosterzeven, Ligonier was made Commander-in-Chief of the Forces. He worked closely with the Pitt–Newcastle ministry who sought his strategic advice in connection with the Seven Years' War which was underway at this time. Ligonier was also made a field marshal on 3 December 1757, Colonel of the 1st Foot Guards on the same date and a peer of Ireland on 10 December 1757 under the title of Viscount Ligonier of Enniskillen. He was notionally given command of British forces in the event of a planned French invasion in 1759 though it never ultimately occurred. He stood down as commander-in-chief in 1759 and became Master-General of the Ordnance. He was given a further Irish peerage on 1 May 1762 as Viscount Ligonier of Clonmell (with remainder to his nephew) and on 19 April 1763 he became a Baron, and on 6 September 1766 an Earl, in the British peerage.

Retirement

He spent his later years at Cobham Park in Cobham, Surrey, which he bought around 1750. He died, still unmarried, on 28 April 1770 and was buried in Cobham Church. There is a monument to him, sculpted by John Francis Moore in Westminster Abbey.

The earldom became extinct but the Irish viscountcy and Cobham Park passed to his nephew Edward, who would also be created Earl Ligonier (but in the Irish peerage) six years later. Ligonier's younger brother, Francis, was also a distinguished soldier.

References

Sources

DNB00: "Ligonier, John"
 
 
 
 
 
 
 
 
 
 
 
 
 

|-

|-

|-

|-

|-

1680 births
1770 deaths
People from Castres
People from Cobham, Surrey
English people of French descent
British field marshals
British military personnel of the War of the Spanish Succession
British Army personnel of the War of the Austrian Succession
Ligonier, John Ligonier, 1st Viscount
Ligonier, John Ligonier, 1st Viscount
Ligonier, John Ligonier, 1st Viscount
Peers of Ireland created by George II
Peers of Great Britain created by George III
Earls in the Peerage of Great Britain
Ligonier, John Ligonier, 1st Viscount
Members of the Privy Council of Great Britain
Knights Companion of the Order of the Bath
7th Dragoon Guards officers
Grenadier Guards officers
Royal Horse Guards officers
Fellows of the Royal Society